Kenya Kwanza (Swahili: "Kenya First") is a Kenyan political alliance currently headed by William Ruto. The political coalition currently holds a majority in both the National Assembly and Senate of Kenya. It was formed in the period leading up to the 2022 Kenyan general election, originally consisting of three parties: the United Democratic Alliance (UDA), Amani National Congress and FORD–Kenya. By 8 April 2022, several more political parties had joined the alliance, bringing the total number of constituent parties to 12. On 18 August 2022, a number of politicians from the United Democratic Movement announced they would be joining the alliance.

The coalition instruments affirm that the constituent parties themselves remain independent with their own leadership structures. In practice, however, the various party organs and committees harmonize their decisions with each other. In addition to supporting a common presidential and vice presidential candidate, the constituent parties do, upon consensus, field a common candidate in various other elective positions.

History 
After arriving at a coalition deal, the Kenya Kwanza Alliance announced that the positions of the coalitions' flag-bearer and running-mate were reserved for the UDA. Thus, UDA party leader William Ruto became the coalition's designated candidate. William Ruto chose Rigathi Gachagua as his running mate in what was perceived as a blunder at the time, overlooking Kithure Kindiki, the senator for Tharaka Nithi. The Kenya Kwanza coalition deal also stipulated that upon winning the election, the position of Prime Cabinet Secretary was to be created and reserved for the founding party the Amani National Congress. The positions of Speaker of the National Assembly and Speaker of the Senate were reserved for FORD-Kenya and the Pamoja African Alliance respectively.

After the 2022 elections, a dispute ensued between Kenya Kwanza and its main rival coalition, Azimio la Umoja, after both sides laid claim to the majority. Both Speaker of the National Assembly Moses Wetangula and his Senate counterpart Amason Kingi decided in favor of Kenya Kwanza.

Current composition

As of 12 April 2022, the alliance consisted of the following political parties:

References

2022 establishments in Kenya
Political parties established in 2022
Political party alliances in Kenya